Parkersville Friends Meetinghouse, also known as Kennett Preparative Meeting of Friends, is a historic Quaker meeting house located in Pennsbury Township, Chester County, Pennsylvania. It was built in 1830, and rebuilt in 1917 after a fire. It is a one-story, stone building with a gable roof.

It was added to the National Register of Historic Places in 1973.

References

Quaker meeting houses in Pennsylvania
Churches on the National Register of Historic Places in Pennsylvania
Churches completed in 1830
19th-century Quaker meeting houses
Churches in Chester County, Pennsylvania
1830 establishments in Pennsylvania
National Register of Historic Places in Chester County, Pennsylvania